Joaquim de Azevedo Mancebo Airport  is the airport serving Macaé, Brazil. The airport is named after the founder of the local air club.
 
It is operated by Zurich Airport Brasil.

History
The airport was established in the 1960s as an airfield for general aviation and a flying club. In the 1980s the runway was paved and an apron and a terminal with 941 m² were constructed, enabling Macaé Airport to fully support the operations related to the Campos basin. In fact, most of its movement (98%) is related to helicopter flights to/from offshore oil platforms of the Campos basin. Its apron has 6 positions for fixed-wing aircraft and 38 positions for rotorcrafts.

Previously operated by Infraero, on March 15, 2019 Flughafen Zürich AG won a 30-year concession to operate the airport.

On June 1, 2022 the name of the airport was officially changed from Benedito Lacerda to Joaquim de Azevedo Mancebo (1924–1973), celebrating the founder of the local air club.

Airlines and destinations

Access

See also

List of airports in Brazil

References

External links

Airports in Rio de Janeiro (state)